Hosine Bility (born 10 May 2001) is a professional footballer who  plays as a defender for Mafra. Born a Liberian refugee in Guinea, he has represented Australia at youth level.

Club career

Midtjylland
Bility joined Midtjylland in September in 2019 signing a five-year deal with Midtjylland where he initially joined the club's U-19 team. Bility joined Fram Reykjavík in the 2021–22 season making 4 appearances.

Mafra
On August 19, 2022, Bility joined Portuguese second division side Mafra on a five year deal.

International career
Bility is eligible to play for Guinea, Liberia, and Australia internationally. Bility played three matches for Australia men's national under-23 soccer team in the 2022 AFC U-23 Asian Cup.

Personal life
Hosine Bility was born in Guinea but raised in Adelaide, Bility has played with Croydon Kings in the NPL.

References

2001 births
Living people
Australian soccer players
Australia under-23 international soccer players
Guinean footballers
Guinean emigrants to Australia
Australian people of Guinean descent
Association football defenders
C.D. Mafra players